Antal Melis (born 12 May 1946) is a Hungarian rower who competed in the 1968 Summer Olympics and in the 1972 Summer Olympics.

He was born in Budapest.

In 1968 he was a crew member of the Hungarian boat which won the silver medal in the coxless four event.

Four years later he was eliminated with the Hungarian boat in the repêchage of the coxless four competition.

External links
 profile

1945 births
Living people
Hungarian male rowers
Olympic rowers of Hungary
Rowers at the 1968 Summer Olympics
Rowers at the 1972 Summer Olympics
Olympic silver medalists for Hungary
Olympic medalists in rowing
Medalists at the 1968 Summer Olympics
European Rowing Championships medalists
Rowers from Budapest